Prosapia is a genus of froghoppers in the family Cercopidae. There are about six described species in Prosapia. The genus is distributed in North and Central America, including the Caribbean.

Species
These six species belong to the genus Prosapia:
 Prosapia bicincta (Say, 1830) i c g b (two-lined spittlebug)
 Prosapia flavifascia (Metcalf & Bruner, 1925) c g
 Prosapia ignipectus (Fitch, 1851) i g b (red-legged spittlebug)
 Prosapia latens Fennah, 1953 c g
 Prosapia plagiata (Distant, 1878) c g
 Prosapia simulans (Walker, 1858) c g
Data sources: i = ITIS, c = Catalogue of Life, g = GBIF, b = Bugguide.net

References

Further reading

External links

 

Cercopidae
Auchenorrhyncha genera
Articles created by Qbugbot